The Lithuanian Trade Union Confederation (LPSK) is a national trade union center in Lithuania. It was founded May 1, 2002 by the merger of the Lithuanian Trade Union Unification (LPSS) and the Lithuanian Trade Union Centre (LPSC).

The LPSK is affiliated with the International Trade Union Confederation and the European Trade Union Confederation.

References

External links
Official site.

Trade unions in Lithuania
International Trade Union Confederation
European Trade Union Confederation
Organizations based in Vilnius
Trade unions established in 2002